Nosophora is a genus of moths of the family Crambidae.

Species
Nosophora albiguttalis Swinhoe, 1890
Nosophora barbata Hampson, 1899
Nosophora bisexualis Hampson, 1912
Nosophora dispilalis Hampson, 1896
Nosophora euryterminalis (Hampson, 1918)
Nosophora euspilalis (Walker, 1866)
Nosophora flavibasalis Hampson, 1899
Nosophora fulvalis Hampson, 1898
Nosophora glyphodalis (Walker, 1866)
Nosophora hypsalis Walker, [1866]
Nosophora incomitata (Swinhoe, 1894)
Nosophora insignis (Butler, 1881)
Nosophora maculalis (Leech, 1889)
Nosophora margarita Butler, 1887
Nosophora mesosticta Hampson, 1912
Nosophora nubilis C. Felder, R. Felder & Rogenhofer, 1875
Nosophora obliqualis (Hampson, 1893)
Nosophora ochnodes Meyrick, 1886
Nosophora panaresalis (Walker, 1859)
Nosophora parvipunctalis Hampson, 1896
Nosophora quadrisignata Moore, 1884
Nosophora semitritalis (Lederer, 1863)
Nosophora taihokualis Strand, 1918
Nosophora tripunctalis (Pagenstecher, 1884)
Nosophora unipunctalis (Pagenstecher, 1884)

References

Spilomelinae
Crambidae genera
Taxa named by Julius Lederer